Antoan is a given name. Notable people with this name include the following

Given name
Antoan Richardson (born 1983), Bahamian baseball coach and player
Antoan Stoyanov (born 2005), Bulgarian footballer

See also

Antoin
Antoon
Anton (given name)
Antona (name)
Antoun
Antuan
Antwan